Vance M. Badawey  (born October 5, 1964) is a Canadian politician who was elected to represent the riding of Niagara Centre in the House of Commons of Canada in the 2015 federal election.

Badawey was first elected to the city council of Port Colborne in 1994, serving until 1997, at which point he was elected mayor.  He retired from mayoral office in 2003, but sought another term in 2006, serving until 2014. He was simultaneously elected as a councilor for the Regional Municipality of Niagara, and served on the Police Services Board.  He currently resides in Port Colborne.

On December 3, 2021, Vance Badawey was appointed Parliamentary Secretary to Canada's Minister of Indigenous Services.

Electoral record

Federal

Provincial

Municipal

References

External links
 

Living people
Members of the House of Commons of Canada from Ontario
Liberal Party of Canada MPs
Year of birth uncertain
Indigenous Members of the House of Commons of Canada
Mayors of places in Ontario
Ontario municipal councillors
Métis politicians
People from Port Colborne
21st-century Canadian politicians
1964 births